Wybrow is a surname. Notable people with the surname include:

Christopher Wybrow (born 1961), Australian water polo player
John Wybrow (1928–2019), New Zealand politician and diplomat
William Wybrow (1805–1897), English cricketer

See also
Whybrow